Edmund Horan was an Irish Clann na Talmhan politician. He was a member of Seanad Éireann from 1944 to 1948. He was elected to the 5th Seanad in July 1944 by the Agricultural Panel. He did not contest the 1948 Seanad election.

He stood unsuccessfully for Dáil Éireann on four occasions. He stood as an independent candidate for the Kerry North constituency at the 1943 general election, and for the Kerry South constituency at the 1944 general election. He stood as Clann na Talmhan candidate for Kerry South at the November 1944 and December 1945 by-elections.

References

Year of birth missing
Year of death missing
Clann na Talmhan senators
Irish farmers
Members of the 5th Seanad
People from County Kerry